I Once Had a Comrade (German: Ich hatt' einen Kameraden) is a 1926 German silent film directed by Conrad Wiene and starring Erich Kaiser-Titz, Otz Tollen and Erwin Fichtner.

The film's art direction was by Robert A. Dietrich.

Cast
Erich Kaiser-Titz 
Otz Tollen
Erwin Fichtner
Carl de Vogt 
Louis Brody
Hans Albers 
Olaf Fjord 
Conrad Flockner
Bernecke Heinz
Emil Heyse
Fritz Kampers
Grete Papst
Ernst Pittschau
Grete Reinwald
Frida Richard
Herbert Stock
Iwa Wanja
Andja Zimowa

References

External links

Films of the Weimar Republic
Films directed by Conrad Wiene
German silent feature films
German black-and-white films